Brunei participated in the 2009 Southeast Asian Games in the city of Vientiane, Laos from 9 December 2009 to 18 December 2009.

Medal table

Medalists

References

2009
Southeast Asian Games
Nations at the 2009 Southeast Asian Games